Rudolf Kraj (born 5 December 1977 in Mělník, Czechoslovakia) is a Czech boxer.

Amateur
He won the silver medal in the men's Light Heavyweight (81 kg) category at the 2000 Summer Olympics in Sydney. He lost to Aleksandr Lebziak in the final.

He also won a bronze medal at the World Amateur Boxing Championships in Bangkok losing to another Russian, the eventual winner Evgeny Makarenko. 
He won 170 out of 200 amateur matches.

Olympic results
1st round bye
Defeated Olanda Anderson (United States) 13-12
Defeated Jegbefumer Albert (Nigeria) 8-7
Defeated Andriy Fedchuk (Ukraine) 11-7
Lost to Aleksandr Lebziak (Russia) 6-20

Professional
Kraj began his professional career in 2005 in Germany and won all his thirteen bouts in the cruiserweight division including a stoppage of Armenian Melkomian (record 20-1).

He fought Giacobbe Fragomeni for the WBC Cruiserweight title on October 24, 2008 and lost the fight by technical decision after eight rounds after and accidental headbutt earlier in the fight. His record is 14-1 with 10 knockouts.

Professional boxing record

| style="text-align:center;" colspan="8"|14 Wins (10 knockouts), 1 Loss, 0 Draws
|-  style="text-align:center; background:#e3e3e3;"
|  style="border-style:none none solid solid; "|Res.
|  style="border-style:none none solid solid; "|Record
|  style="border-style:none none solid solid; "|Opponent
|  style="border-style:none none solid solid; "|Type
|  style="border-style:none none solid solid; "|Round
|  style="border-style:none none solid solid; "|Date
|  style="border-style:none none solid solid; "|Location
|  style="border-style:none none solid solid; "|Notes
|- align=center
|Loss
|14–1
|align=left| Giacobbe Fragomeni
|||
|
|align=left|
|align=left|
|- align=center
|Win
|14–0
|align=left| Matt Godfrey
|||
|
|align=left|
|align=left|
|- align=center
|Win
|13-0
|align=left| Orlando Antonio Farias
|||
|
|align=left|
|align=left|
|- align=center
|Win
|12–0
|align=left| Ismail Abdoul
|||
|
|align=left|
|align=left|
|- align=center
|Win
|11–0
|align=left| Mauro Adrian Ordiales
|||
|
|align=left|
|align=left|
|- align=center
|Win
|10–0
|align=left| Cesar David Crenz
|||
|
|align=left|
|align=left|
|- align=center
|Win
|9–0
|align=left| Pavel Melkomyan
|||
|
|align=left|
|align=left|
|- align=center
|Win
|8–0
|align=left| Rachid El Hadak
|||
|
|align=left|
|align=left|
|- align=center
|Win
|7–0
|align=left| Jindrich Velecky
|||
|
|align=left|
|align=left|
|- align=center
|Win
|6–0
|align=left| Mircea Telecan
|||
|
|align=left|
|align=left|
|- align=center
|Win
|5–0
|align=left| Vage Kocharyan
|||
|
|align=left|
|align=left|
|- align=center
|Win
|4–0
|align=left| Robert Borok
|||
|
|align=left|
|align=left|
|- align=center
|Win
|3–0
|align=left| Rustams Tumasevics
|||
|
|align=left|
|align=left|
|- align=center
|Win
|2–0
|align=left| Valeriu Vasili Dobrin
|||
|
|align=left|
|align=left|
|- align=center
|Win
|1–0
|align=left| Tomáš Mrázek
|||
|
|align=left|
|align=left|
|- align=center

External links
 News and Pictures of Rudolf Kraj
 

1977 births
Living people
Boxers at the 2000 Summer Olympics
Olympic boxers of the Czech Republic
Olympic silver medalists for the Czech Republic
Olympic medalists in boxing
Czech male boxers
AIBA World Boxing Championships medalists
Medalists at the 2000 Summer Olympics
Light-heavyweight boxers
People from Mělník
Sportspeople from the Central Bohemian Region